

Carlo, Count Gozzi (13 December 1720 – 4 April 1806) was an Italian (Venetian) playwright and champion of Commedia dell'arte.

Early life 
Gozzi was born and died in Venice; he came from a family of minor Venetian aristocracy, the Tiepolos.  At a young age, his parents were no longer able to support him financially, so he joined the army in Dalmatia. Three years later, he had returned to Venice and joined the Granelleschi Society. This society was dedicated to the pursuit of preservation of  Tuscan literature from the influence of foreign culture; it was particularly interested in saving traditional Italian comedy such as Commedia dell'arte.

Works 
Pietro Chiari and Carlo Goldoni, two Venetian writers, were moving away from the old style of Italian theatre, which threatened the work of the Granelleschi Society. In 1757 Gozzi defended Commedia dell'arte by publishing a satirical poem, La tartana degli influssi per l'anno 1756; and in 1761, in his comedy based on a fairy tale, The Love for Three Oranges or Analisi riflessiva della fiaba L'amore delle tre melarance, he parodied Chiari and Goldoni. To perform his play, he obtained the services of the Sacchi company of players, a Commedia dell'arte troupe who had been out of work due to the dwindling interest in Commedia dell'arte after Chiari and Goldoni's efforts.  Their satirical powers thus sharpened by personal vendetta, the play was an extraordinary success, and Gozzi donated his play and the rest of his fairy tales to Sacchi's troupe, which in effect saved the company. While some have called Gozzi the saviour of Commedia dell'arte there has been much debate due to the fact that Gozzi wrote out all his scripts and traditional Commedia dell'arte is mainly improvised.

Struck by the effect produced on the audience by the introduction of the supernatural or mythical element, which he had merely used as a convenient medium for his satirical purposes, Gozzi produced a series of dramatic pieces based on fairy tales. These were hugely popular, but after Sacchi's company disbanded, they were unjustly neglected. Gozzi's fairy tales drew influence from Commedia dell'arte, and the popularity of them caused a revival of Commedia dell'arte in Italy. These fairy tales were much praised by Goethe, Schlegel brothers, Hoffmann, Madame de Staël, Sismondi and Ostrovsky. One of them, Turandot or La Turandotte, was translated by Friedrich Schiller and staged by Goethe in Weimar in 1802 with great success. Gozzi was acclaimed throughout most of Europe, but was less esteemed in his own homeland.

In the last years of Gozzi's life he had begun to experiment by producing tragedies with largely comical influences, but these endeavors were met with harsh critical response. He then began to work in Spanish drama, and found minor success before his death. He was buried in the church of San Cassiano in Venice.

Personal life 
He is well known for his feuds with Carlo Goldoni and Pietro Chiari between 1756-1762 over the changing style of Italian theatre that was moving away from the masked and improvised styling of Commedia dell'arte.

He was the titular protector of the actress Teodora Ricci, and caused the voluntary exile of Pier Antonio Gratarol, a member of Venetian society whom Gozzi's Draghe d'Amore was partially based on, for having an affair with and ruining the reputation of Ricci.

His brother, Gasparo Gozzi, was also a well-known writer of the time.

His collected works were published under his own superintendence at Venice in 1792, in 10 volumes.

A number of twentieth-century stage works were inspired by Gozzi's plays. These include treatments of Turandot by Karl Vollmöller and Bertolt Brecht, operas based on the same story by Ferruccio Busoni, and, more famously, Giacomo Puccini, Sergei Prokofiev's The Love of Three Oranges, Alfredo Casella's La donna serpente and Hans Werner Henze's König Hirsch.

Works

Plays
Fiabe Teatrali — "Tales for the Theatre"

 L'amore delle tre melarance — "The Love of Three Oranges" (1761)
 Il corvo — "The Raven" (1761)
 Il Re Cervo — "The King Stag" (1762)
 Turandot (1762)
 La donna serpente — "The Serpent Woman" (1762)
 La Zobeide (1763)
 I Pitocchi Fortunati — "The Fortunate Beggars" (1764)
 Il Mostro Turchino — "The Blue Monster" (1764)
 L'Augellino Bel Verde — "The Green Bird" (1765)
 Zeim, Re de' Geni — "Zeim, King of the Genies" (1765)

Other plays
 Marfisa bizzarra (1766)
 The Elixir of Love (1775/1776)
 Il Cavaliere Amico; o sia, Il Trionfo dell'Amicizia — "The Knight; or, The Triumph of Friendship" (Tragicomedy in 5 Acts)
 Doride; o sia, La Rassegnata — "Doride; or, The Resigned" (Tragicomedy in 5 Acts)
 La Donna Vendicativa — "The Vengeful Woman" (Tragicomedy in 5 Acts)
 La Caduta di Donna Elvira, Regina di Navarra — "The Fall of Donna Elvira, Queen of Navarre" [Prologo Tragico].
 La Punizione nel Precipizio — "Punishment in the Precipice" (Tragicomedy in 3 Acts)
 Il Pubblico Secreto — "The Public Secret" (Comedy in 3 Acts)
 Le Due Notti Affannose; o sia, gl'Inganni della Immaginazione — "Two Frantic Nights; or, Illusions of Imagination" (Tragicomedy in 5 Acts)
 La Principessa Filosofa; o sia, Il Controveleno — "The Princess Philosopher; or, The Antidote" (Drama in 3 Acts)
 I Due Fratelli Nimici — "The Two Enemy Brothers" (Tragicomedy in 3 Acts)
 Eco e Narciso — "Echo and Narcissus" (Seriocomic Pastoral with Music in 3 Acts)
 Il Moro di Corpo Bianco; o sia, Lo Schiavo del Proprio Onore — "The Moor with White Body; or, The Slave of his own Honor" (Tragicomedy in 5 Acts)
 La Donna Contraria al Consiglio — "The Woman Against the Council" (Scenic Composition in 5 Acts)
 Cimene Pardo — "Cimene Pardo" (Tragedy in 5 Acts)
 Innamorata da Vero — "True Love" (Comedy in 3 Acts)
 Bianca Contessa di Melfi; o sia, Il Maritaggio per Vendetta — "Bianca, Countess of Malfi; or, the Maritaggio for Vendetta" (Tragedy in 5 Acts)
 Il Montanaro Don Giovanni Pasquale — "The Montanaro Don Giovanni Pasquale" (Moral Stage Action in 5 Acts)
 La Figlia dell'Aria; o sia, L'Innalzamento di Semiramide — "Daughter of the Air; or, The Rise of Semiramis" (Allegorical Tale in 3 Acts)
 Il Metafisico; o sia, L'Amore, e L'Amicizia alla Prova — "The Metaphysical; or, Love and Friendship Put to the Test" (Drama 3 Acts)
 Annibale, Duca di Atene — "Hannibal, Duke of Athens" (Verse Representation in 5 Acts)
 La Malia della Voce — "The Woman's(?) Voice" (Drama 5 Acts)
 Amore Assottiglia il Cervello — "Love Thins the Brain" (Comedy in 5 Acts)
 La Vedova del Malabar — "The Widow of Malabar" (Tragedy in 5 Acts)

Other works
 Ragionamento ingenuo, e storia sincera dell'origine delle mie dieci Fiabe teatrali — "Ingenuous Disquisition and Sincere History of My Ten Tales for the Theatre" (1772)
 Memorie Inutili — "Useless Memoirs" (1777, published 1797)

Editions
 Carlo Gozzi, Memorie inutili (éd. Giuseppe Prezzolini). Laterza, Bari 1910.
 Carlo Gozzi, Opere del Co: Carlo Gozzi. Colombani, Venezia/Firenze 1772[-1774].
 Carlo Gozzi, Opere edite ed inedite del Co. Carlo Gozzi. Zanardi, Venezia 1801[-1803].
 Carlo Gozzi, Opere. Teatro e polemiche teatrali (éd. Giorgio Petronio). Rizzoli, Milano 1962.
 Scritti di Carlo Gozzi éd. E. Bonora. Einaudi, Torino 1977.
 Carlo Gozzi, Le fiabe teatrali (= Biblioteca di Cultura. 261). Testo, introduzione e commento a cura di Paolo Bosisio. Bulzoni, Rom 1984.
 Carlo Gozzi, Theatralische Werke. Aus dem italiänischen übersezt. 5 voll. Typographische Gesellschaft, Bern 1777–1779.

Notes and references

Notes

References

Further reading
 Carmelo Alberti (ed.), Carlo Gozzi, scrittore di teatro (= La fenice dei teatri. 1). Bulzoni, Rom 1996, . 
 Alfredo Beniscelli, La finzione del fiabesco. Studi sul teatro di Carlo Gozzi,(= Collana di saggistica, vol. 19). Marietti, Casale Monferrato 1986, .
 Michele Bordin, Anna Scannapieco (eds.): Antologia della critica goldoniana e gozziana. Marsilio, Venezia 2009, .
 Paolo Bosisio, Carlo Gozzi e Goldoni. Una polemica letteraria, Olschki, Firenze 1979.
 Françoise Decroisette, "Carlo Gozzi", in Il contributo italiano alla storia del pensiero. La Letteratura, Giulio Ferroni (ed.), Roma, Enciclopedia Treccani, 2017.
 Helmut Feldmann, Die Fiabe Carlo Gozzis. Die Entstehung einer Gattung und ihre Transposition in das System der deutschen Romantik (= Studi italiani. Bd. 11). Böhlau, Köln u. a. 1971, .
 Siro Ferrone, Attori mercanti corsari. La Commedia dell'arte in Europa tra Cinque e Seicento, Einaudi, Torino 1993.
 Bodo Guthmüller/Wolfgang Osthoff (eds.), Carlo Gozzi. Letteratura e musica (= La fenice dei teatri. 4). Bulzoni, Rom 1997, .
 Thomas F. Heck, Commedia dell'Arte: A Guide to the Primary and Secondary Literature, Garland, New York 1988.
 Kii-Ming Lo, Turandot auf der Opernbühne, Peter Lang, Frankfurt/Bern/New York 1996.
 Gérard Luciani, L’œuvre de Carlo Gozzi et les polémiques théâtrales contre les Lumières, dans: Studies on Voltaire and the Eighteenth Century 89/1972, pp. 939–974.
 Gérard Luciani, Carlo Gozzi : 1720-1806, l’homme et l’œuvre…, Paris, H. Champion, 1977.
 Gérard Luciani, Carlo Gozzi, ou, L’enchanteur désenchanté, Grenoble, Presses universitaires de Grenoble, 2001 .
 Arnaldo Momo, La carriera delle maschere nel teatro di Goldoni, Chiari, Gozzi, Marsilio, Venezia 1992.
 Allardyce Nicoll, The World of Harlequin, Cambridge University Press, Cambridge 1963.
 Robert Perroud, La défense et l'utilisation des ‚masques’ de la commedia dell'arte dans l'oeuvre de Carlo Gozzi. In: Roger Bauer, Jürgen Wertheimer (eds.), Das Ende des Stegreifspiels – Die Geburt des Nationaltheaters. Ein Wendepunkt in der Geschichte des europäischen Dramas. Fink, München 1983, pp. 9–16.
 Jean Starobinski, Ironie et mélancholie (I): Le théâtre de Carlo Gozzi, dans: Critiques 22 (1966), pp. 438–457.
 Jean Starobinski, Portrait de l'artiste en saltimbanque, Gallimard, Paris 1983/2004, .
 Jörn Steigerwald, Serendipità oder Selbstaufklärung im Medium des Theaters: Carlo Gozzis „Il re cervo". In: Das achtzehnte Jahrhundert. Nr. 35.1, 2011, pp. 73–89.
 Frederik D. Tunnat, Karl Vollmoeller. Dichter und Kulturmanager. Eine Biographie. tredition, Hamburg 2008,  (gives information on Vollmoeller's productions of Gozzi's plays).
 Olga Visentini, Movenze dell'esotismo: »il caso Gozzi«, in: Jürgen Maehder (ed.), Esotismo e colore locale nell'opera di Puccini. Atti del I° Convegno Internazionale sull'opera di Giacomo Puccini, Giardini, Pisa 1985, pp. 37–51.
 Susanne Winter, Von illusionärer Wirklichkeit und wahrer Illusion. Zu Carlo Gozzis Fiabe teatrali, Frankfurt/Main 2007, . 
 Friedrich Wolfzettel, Märchen, Aufklärung und ‚Antiaufklärung’: zu den ‚fiabe teatrali’ Carlo Gozzis dans: Aufklärung, éd. Roland Galle, Helmut Pfeiffer, Fink, Paderborn/München 2007, pp. 117–145.

External links
 
 
 
 The Memoirs of Count Carlo Gozzi at gutenberg.org

1720 births
1806 deaths
18th-century Italian dramatists and playwrights
Commedia dell'arte
18th-century Venetian writers